The Big Blue Bug, also known as Nibbles Woodaway, is the giant termite mascot of Big Blue Bug Solutions located along I-95 in Providence, Rhode Island. It was constructed over a four-day period from wire mesh and fiberglass in late 1980 at a cost of $20,000.

History
The Big Blue Bug was built by Avenia Sign Company of North Providence. Anthony Pescarino, Tom Grenga, and Ronald Levesque assembled the sign over the course of a couple of months. Pescarino said, "We had to put the wings together and brought them to Valley Street to have them coated in fiberglass." It was fiberglassed by Robert Garafano, Sr. of Olneyville; it was assembled on site and then raised to the roof. The Bug was originally painted purple, the color of an actual swarming termite when observed under a microscope, but the paint soon faded to a pale blue and the landmark became so well known in that condition that it was never repainted to its original color. It was originally known only as the "Big Blue Bug," a name coined by Providence traffic reporter Mike Sheridan, until it received the name Nibbles Woodaway in a contest in 1990. Geraldine Perry of Tiverton submitted the winning name.

Recent events
The Bug is annually "dressed" for Independence Day, Halloween, the season opener of the Pawtucket Red Sox baseball team, and Christmas (in lights, reindeer antlers, and a blinking red nose). Since 1990, the company has sold stuffed toys in the Bug's likeness.

The Bug left its home on June 20, 2002, for a five-stop tour. It was refurbished and painted a brighter blue before being returned to the roof of New England Pest Control. On April 9, 2012, New England Pest Control announced that they would be changing the company's name to "Big Blue Bug Solutions". The bug wore a necktie for the occasion.

In April 2020, in support of the "front line workers" facing COVID-19, the Big Blue Bug has put on a surgical mask.

In popular culture 
The bug has made numerous media appearances, including:

Films:

 Dumb and Dumber
 Dumb and Dumber To

Television:

 The Today Show
 The Oprah Winfrey Show
 The Daily Show
 Family Guy

Comic strips:

 Zippy the Pinhead
 Breaking Cat News by Georgia Dunn has the lighting of the Big Blue Bug as a subject of several strips.
 Bosquet

Books

 Providence by Geoffrey Wolff
 Roadside America by Mike Wilkins, Ken Smith, and Doug Kirby
 Weird New England by Joseph Citro. 
 The 2021 novel Providence Blue by David Pinault features the Big Blue Bug as a set piece and plot device.

Podcasts:

 Sara Corben's Weird Island in Episode 39: Rhodeside Attractions: The Big Blue Bug

Other:

It was featured on a state scratch-off lottery ticket in 1997.

References

External links

Big Blue Bug Solutions home page
RoadsideAmerica.com Report on the Blue Bug
Quahog.org description of Nibbles
Weird Island (simplecast.com)
 Forliti, Amy (May 27, 2001) Article in The Standard-Times For 2-ton, blue termite, near-cult status in R.I.

Landmarks in Rhode Island
Roadside attractions in Rhode Island
Culture of Providence, Rhode Island
Individual signs in the United States
Interstate 95
1980 establishments in Rhode Island
Mascots introduced in 1980
Termites
Insects in art
Animal mascots